Angela Ajodo (born 30 December 1972) is a Nigerian handball player. She competed in the 1992 Summer Olympics.

Handball

References

1972 births
Living people
Handball players at the 1992 Summer Olympics
Nigerian female handball players
Olympic handball players of Nigeria